Windows Mobile is a mobile operating system developed by Microsoft, based on Windows CE and is the successor to Pocket PC 2002 and predecessor of Windows Phone. New devices running Windows Mobile were released between 2003 and 2010. Many different companies produced devices running Windows Mobile during this time frame. The table below groups devices into two categories, those with cellular capability and those without. The version of Windows Mobile 5.x called "Smartphone", and the version of Windows Mobile 6.x called "Standard", is designed to run on devices without a touch screen; all other devices listed have touch screens.

Windows Mobile 2003

Windows Mobile 2003 Second Edition (SE)

Windows Mobile 5.0

Windows Mobile 6.0

Windows Mobile 6.1

Windows Mobile 6.5

See also
List of Windows Phone devices (Windows Mobile is not to be confused with Windows Phone)

References
Directory of devices based on Windows Mobile

 
Windows